The Debar Mountain Wild Forest is a  tract designated as Wild Forest by the New York State Department of Environmental Conservation in the northeastern Adirondack Park, just north of Paul Smiths, in Franklin County. The area is served by state routes NY-3, NY-30 and NY-458.

Activities supported include hiking, cross country skiing, snowshoeing, horse back riding, mountain biking, snowmobiling, hunting, fishing, canoeing and boating.

Car camping is available at Meacham Lake and Buck Pond Campgrounds.  There are also 21 remote campsites and four lean-tos. Other bodies of water include the St. Regis River, Osgood Pond, Jones Pond, Deer River Flow, Mountain Pond, and Lake Kushaqua.

See also

List of New York wild forests

References

External links
New York State Department of Environmental Conservation
NYS DEC Meacham Lake Campground
NYS DEC Buck Pond Campground

Adirondack Park
Protected areas of Franklin County, New York
Forests of New York (state)